West Branch is a city in the U.S. state of Michigan. As of the 2010 census, the city population was 2,139. It is the county seat of Ogemaw County.  West Branch is mostly surrounded by West Branch Township, but the two are administered autonomously.

Geography

Climate
This climatic region is typified by large seasonal temperature differences, with warm to hot (and often humid) summers and cold (sometimes severely cold) winters. According to the Köppen Climate Classification system, West Branch has a humid continental climate, abbreviated "Dfb" on climate maps.

Major highways

Demographics

2010 census
As of the census of 2010, there were 2,139 people, 1,006 households, and 489 families living in the city. The racial makeup of the city was 96.9% White, 0.5% African American, 0.6% Native American, 0.7% Asian, 0.2% from other races, and 1.1% from two or more races. Hispanic or Latino of any race were 1.7% of the population.

There were 1,006 households, of which 24.1% had children under the age of 18 living with them, 28.9% were married couples living together, 15.7% had a female householder with no husband present, 4.0% had a male householder with no wife present, and 51.4% were non-families. 45.2% of all households were made up of individuals, and 23.3% had someone living alone who was 65 years of age or older. The average household size was 1.99 and the average family size was 2.74.

The median age in the city was 44.3 years. 20.7% of residents were under the age of 18; 8.8% were between the ages of 18 and 24; 21% were from 25 to 44; 25.2% were from 45 to 64; and 24.3% were 65 years of age or older. The gender makeup of the city was 42.9% male and 57.1% female.

2000 census
As of the census of 2000, there were 1,926 people, 833 households, and 475 families living in the city. The racial makeup of the city was 95.17% White, 0.10% African American, 0.52% Native American, 2.60% Asian, 0.16% from other races, and 1.45% from two or more races. Hispanic or Latino of any race were 0.73% of the population.

There were 833 households, out of which 29.7% had children under the age of 18 living with them, 38.8% were married couples living together, 14.5% had a female householder with no husband present, and 42.9% were non-families. 37.9% of all households were made up of individuals, and 18.1% had someone living alone who was 65 years of age or older. The average household size was 2.24 and the average family size was 2.95.

In the city, the population was spread out, with 25.6% under the age of 18, 8.6% from 18 to 24, 30.5% from 25 to 44, 19.7% from 45 to 64, and 15.6% who were 65 years of age or older. The median age was 35 years. For every 100 females, there were 89.6 males. For every 100 females age 18 and over, there were 82.4 males.

The median income for a household in the city was $30,132, and the median income for a family was $35,385. Males had a median income of $30,677 versus $21,343 for females. The per capita income for the city was $17,852. About 9.9% of families and 14.0% of the population were below the poverty line, including 18.4% of those under age 18 and 15.7% of those age 65 or over.

Education
West Branch-Rose City Area Schools is a local public school district. Residents are served by Surline Elementary and Middle Schools, as well as by Ogemaw Heights High School, which serves both West Branch and Rose City. The high school's mascot is the falcon. Saint Joseph Catholic School is a private parochial elementary school in West Branch, serving students from preschool through eighth grade. It is affiliated with the Diocese of Gaylord of the Roman Catholic Church, and is a member of the National Catholic Educational Association. Post-secondary education in the area is provided by Kirtland Community College.

Medical facilities
MidMichigan Medical Center – West Branch (formerly West Branch Regional Medical Center before April 2, 2018) is located on 2463 S. M-30. They offer many different specialties, such as rehabilitation programs, condition-specific educational sources, and a revolutionary wound care center. The rehabilitation programs offered range from neurological to physical. The three main programs offered are physical therapy, occupational therapy, and speech therapy. A couple of the physical therapy treatments offered are post-surgical hip rehabilitation and even a weight management program. Their occupational therapy program offers functional capacity evaluations and shoulder pain and post-surgical shoulder rehabilitation. Speech therapy programs help with speech and cognitive disorders and also swallowing disorders.

The Wound Care Center at West Branch Regional Medical Center offers many opportunities to patients who suffer from non-healing wounds or from chronic pain related to a wound. This program offers cutting-edge treatment, including but not limited to debridement, specialized wound dressings, compression therapy, bio-engineered skin grafts, and hyperbaric oxygen therapy. Non-healing wounds can be caused by poor circulation to the wound or if the patient is unable to move shortly after surgery or a serious wound. The Wound Care Center is a place that gives patients that they will one day heal from their serious wounds.

On July 1, 2010, West Branch Regional Medical Center closed its obstetrics ward, no longer serving expectant mothers in the community. No other units were anticipated to close at the time, and expectant mothers were referred to nearby hospitals in cities like Tawas, Saginaw, Midland, or Bay City for delivery, after consulting with their physician. On Monday, March 1, 2021, at 10 a.m, MidMichigan Medical Center – West Branch reopened its obstetrics ward with a virtual grand reopening.

Local activities and attractions
West Branch contains Irons Park, a city park established in 1955 and named for former landowner Archie Irons. Many events are held in the park yearly, including an Easter egg hunt, the Humane Society Mutt March, the Summer Music Series, the Victorian Art Fair, a fishing derby, and duck races, to name a few. The park is also the home of Fort Austin, named in memory of Austin Clark, which consists of a large, complex, modern, wooden play-scape. The park has many activities available, including biking, fishing, bird-watching, and many children's activities; the park also has two tennis courts, basketball courts, picnic tables, grills, and two bathroom facilities. In the winter, Irons Park is often used for sledding.

In 2014, the John Tolfree Hospital installed the Tolfree Wellness Park on the West Branch Regional Medical Center’s campus. This was the first step to WBRMC's Go Outside! project to address childhood obesity in poverty-stricken families. The park houses a 3.3 mile trail, gardens, a greenhouse, and a pavilion. The park also sponsors the Soles for Cardio Run/Walk to promote fun and healthy lifestyles; all proceeds go to health and wellness programs at the medical center and to help maintain the Tolfree Wellness Park. 

West Branch also has two bowling alleys, Ogemaw Lanes and Hi-Skore. West Branch Cinema 3, the local movie theater, is located in the downtown Victorian district. Special seasonal activities also abound in the area. Kirtland Community College hosts the R.O.A.R. (Rock Out Against Rape) Battle of the Bands to benefit Grayling's River House shelter, which serves survivors and victims of domestic violence and sexual abuse in Crawford, Ogemaw, Oscoda, and Roscommon counties. In February, West Branch is home to the Ogemaw County Winterfest. The Ogemaw County Fair is held on the third week in August on Rifle River Trail, just 8 miles east of the city. During the last week of July, West Branch hosts Relay for Life in Irons Park, supporting the fight against breast cancer, raising money for charities, and increasing awareness of breast cancer.

Notable people
 Catherine Laurion, Miss Michigan Teen USA 2005 and first runner-up in the national Miss Teen USA 2005 pageant
 Alex Rose, athlete who represented Samoa at the 2016 and 2020 Summer Olympics
 Dita Von Teese, vedette, burlesque dancer, model, and businesswoman, known as the "Queen of Burlesque"
 Dave Walter, former NFL quarterback for the Cincinnati Bengals
 Daniel Way, comic book writer, known for his work on Wolverine: Origins and Deadpool
 Joy Williams, singer and songwriter who performed as half of the duo The Civil Wars
 Donny Winter, Pushcart Prize nominated poet
 Anthony Zettel, NFL defensive end who played for several teams and is currently a free agent

Images

References

External links
West Branch Website

Cities in Ogemaw County, Michigan
County seats in Michigan
Populated places established in 1885
1885 establishments in Michigan